Bicosoeca is a genus of bicosoecids in the family Bicosoecaceae.

It is the type genus of its family. The name Bicosoeca, described by James-Clark in 1866, is derived from Greek roots (vase, bowl, plus , inhabit). The philologically preferable compound would be Bicoeca, as "corrected" by Stein in 1878 and followed by most subsequent authors. However, according to the ICBN and ICZN, the original spelling of the name cannot be considered incorrect and it must be used in its original form.

Species
 B. accreta Hibberd 1978
 B. acuminata Stokes 1885
 Bicosoeca antarctica Pankow 1991
 B. dissimilis Stokes 1885
 B. lauterbornei 
 B. lepteca Stokes 1885
 B. leptostoma Stokes 1885
 B. longipes Stokes 1885
 B. mignotii Moestrup, Thomsen & Hibberd 1992
 B. phiala Stokes 1895
 B. ruttneri Wawrik
 B. socialis Lemmermann 1908 non Lauterborn 1894 non Kent 1871
 B. starmachii Hamar 1979
 B. szabadosii Hamar
 B. tenuis Kent 1880
 Bicosoeca section Poteriodendron (von Stein 1878) Bourrelly 1951
 B. dinobryoidea Lemmermann 1914
 B. petiolata (von Stein 1878) Pringsheim 1947 
 Bicosoeca section Stephanocodon (Pascher 1942) Bourrelly 1951
 B. campanulata (Lackey 1942) Bourrelly 1953 em. Skuja 1956
 Bicosoeca irregularis (Pascher 1942) Bourrelly 1951
 B. socialis Lauterborn 1894 non Lemmermann 1908
 B. stellata Bourrelly 1951
 Bicosoeca section Codomonas (Lackey 1939) Bourrelly 1951
 B. ainikkiae Järnefelt 1956
 B. alaskana Hilliard 1971
 B. annulata (Lackey 1939) Bourrelly 1951
 B. crystallina Skuja 1956
 B. cylindrica (Lackey 1939) Bourrelly 1951
 B. depoucquesiana Bourrelly 1951
 B. fottii Bourrelly 1951
 B. kenaiensis (Hilliard 1971) Yubukia et al. 2015
 B. mitra Fott 1946
 B. paropsis Skuja 1956
 B. planctonica Kisselew 1931
 B. turrigera Nygaard 1949
 B. urceolata Fott 1941
 Bicosoeca section Eubicoeca Bourrelly 1951
 B. borealis Hilliard 1971
 B. conica Lemmermann 1914
 B. epiphytica Hilliard 1971
 B. eurystoma Hilliard 1971
 B. exilis Penard 1921
 B. gracilipes James-Clark 1867
 B. kepneri Reynolds 1927
 B. lacustris James-Clark 1867
 B. maris Picken 1941
 B. mediterranea Pavillard 1916
 B. oculata Zacharias 1894
 B. ovata Lemmermann 1914
 B. parva Hilliard 1971
 B. pontica Valkanov 1970
 B. synoica Skuja 1956
 B. vacillans

References

External links 
 
 
 Bicosoeca at WoRMS

Bikosea
Heterokont genera